Sveto Letica  (4 April 1926 – 6 November 2001) was a Croatian admiral, and the first commander of the Croatian Navy.

Biography
Letica was born in 1926 in Podgora, where he was involved in creating a Partisan Navy in 1942. He graduated at the Naval and War Academy. For 20 years he served on different warships of the Yugoslav Navy. He was Fleet commander, he was chief of a naval region, and before his retirement he served in Generalštab of JNA. He retired in 1986 with the rank of Vice Admiral in YPA. By decree of the President of the Presidency of the SFRY from September 1986, he was retroactively promoted to the  rank of admiral. The long-time experience of Letica was precious for Croatia when the Croatian Navy was established in 1991. On 12 September 1991, the President of the Republic, Franjo Tuđman, named him Commander of Croatian Navy. He served as supreme navy commander until his second retirement on 1 June 1996. He was retired by decision of the President. In September 1991 he was confirmed rank of Admiral, and in March 1996 promoted in rank of Fleet Admiral (admiral flote).

He is buried in Lovrinac graveyard in Split.

Career summary

Duties
 Commander of Croatian Navy - 12 September 1991 - 1 June 1996

Ranks

SFRY
Rear Admiral (December 1974)
Vice Admiral (December 1978)
Admiral (September 1986)

Croatia
Fleet Admiral (March 1996)

Decorations
Order of Duke Trpimir
Order of Duke Domagoj
Order of Ban Jelačić
Order of Croatian Trefoil
Order of Croatian Wattle
Commemorative Medal of the Homeland War
Commemorative Medal of the Homeland's Gratitude.

References

1926 births
2001 deaths
Military personnel of the Croatian War of Independence
Croatian admirals
Yugoslav Partisans members
Order of Duke Domagoj recipients
Admirals of the Yugoslav People's Army